Party of Independents (in French: Parti des Indépendents), was a political party in Upper Volta, formed through a split in the Voltaic Democratic Union (UDV-RDA). The party contested the 1970 elections.

Source: Englebert, Pierre. La Revolution Burkinabè. Paris: L'Harmattan, 1986.

Defunct political parties in Burkina Faso